Ritter Pázmán (Knight Pazman) is a three-act opera composed by Johann Strauss II, with the libretto by Ludwig Dóczi. It premiered at the Hofoper in Vienna on New Year's Day in 1892. It is based on a Hungarian narrative poem, Pázmán lovag, written by the Hungarian poet János Arany, and takes about three hours to play its course.

Roles

Synopsis

Place: Hungary
Time: the Renaissance

Acts 1 and 2
Pázmán's castle

The knight's wife and servants are hurrying to prepare a meal to welcome Pázmán and his band on their way back from the hunt. One of the hunters falls in love with the knight's wife, and kisses her on the forehead when the husband is not looking. Later, after the hunter leaves, Pázmán finds out about the kiss, and, having cursed his wife, goes to the king to demand justice.

Act 3
The King's castle

The knight was followed by his wife and maid. He insists that he be allowed to kiss the hunter's wife as revenge. The king then says that he was the one who kissed Pázmán's wife. Pázmán is then allowed to take a kiss from the queen.

Public reception 
When the opera's debut was announced, it was met with great enthusiasm, as was the case with most of Strauss' works, and it attracted special attention because it was Strauss' first (and only) opera. However, at its premiere, it was received coldly, and most critics predicted that it would not last long at the opera house. The Vienna Opera played it only nine times. Critics complained about the banality of the opera's text, and a reviewer for the Wiener Abendpost commented that the characters were not distinguished enough musically. Others said that the opera died of "acute text failure". Some critics, however, such as Richard Heuberger, noted that the instrumentation of the opera was commendable, especially Strauss' use of the dulcimer in the csárdás.

References 
Notes

Sources

External links

 , Global Festival Symphony Orchestra conducted by Enrico Sartori, China New Year's Concert Tour 2021

Operas
1892 operas
Operas by Johann Strauss II
German-language operas
Operas set in Hungary